An Pingsheng (1917–1999) was a People's Republic of China politician. He was governor of Guangxi (1975–1977) and secretary of the Communist Party of China Guangxi Committee (1975–1977). Born in Xi'an, Shaanxi. An was governor of Yunnan as well as CPC Committee Secretary. He was a delegate to the 5th National People's Congress.

1917 births
1999 deaths
People's Republic of China politicians from Shaanxi
Chinese Communist Party politicians from Shaanxi
Governors of Yunnan
Members of the 12th Central Committee of the Chinese Communist Party
Members of the Central Advisory Commission
Delegates to the 5th National People's Congress
Members of the 11th Central Committee of the Chinese Communist Party
Vice-governors of Guangdong
Political commissars of the Yunnan Military District
Members of the 10th Central Committee of the Chinese Communist Party
Political commissars of the Kunming Military Region
Political commissars of the Guangxi Military District